Rhodopila globiformis is a species of bacteria, formerly known as Rhodopseudomonas globiformis. It is a motile, spherical organism. Cells can grow between 1.6 and 1.8 μm in diameter. The photopigments consist of bacteriochlorophyll aP and aliphatic methoxylated ketocarotenoids. The organism grows under anaerobic conditions in the light or under microaerophilic conditions in the dark. Biotin, p-aminobenzoic acid and a source of reduced sulfur are required as growth factors in order to cultivate this bacteria. This bacteria possesses a high potential cytochrome c2.

References

Further reading

Belova, Svetlana E.; Pankratov, Timofei A.; Detkova, Ekaterina N.; Kaparullina, Elena N.; Dedysh, Svetlana N. (July 20, 2009). "Acidisoma tundrae gen. nov., sp. nov. and Acidisoma sibiricum sp. nov., two acidophilic, psychrotolerant members of the Alphaproteobacteria from acidic northern wetlands". International Journal of Systematic and Evolutionary Microbiology 59. doi:10.1099/ijs.0.009209-0.

External links

Type strain of Rhodopila globiformis at BacDive -  the Bacterial Diversity Metadatabase

Rhodospirillales